Düren is a Kreis (district) in the west of North Rhine-Westphalia, Germany. Neighboring districts are Heinsberg, Neuss, Rhein-Erft-Kreis, Euskirchen and Aachen.

History

The district was created in 1972 by merging the former districts of Jülich and Düren. Both districts date back to 1816 when the new Prussian province Rhineland was created. Before the Napoleonic Wars all of the area belonged to the duchy of Jülich.

Geography

Geographically it covers both the lowlands of the Lower Rhine Bay as well as the mountains and hills of the Eifel. The district has rich lignite (brown coal) deposits, which is used in open pit mining. Another big industry is paper production, which dates back to the second part of the 16th century. The main river in the district is the Rur.

Coat of arms

Towns and municipalities

Sister County
Düren has a partnership with Dorchester County in Maryland.

References

External links

 Official website (German)

 
Districts of North Rhine-Westphalia